Freedom Riders, activists who rode the buses during the 1961 Freedom Rides in the Civil Rights Movement in the United States.

Freedom Rider or Freedom Ride also may refer to:

Activism
 Freedom Ride (Australia), 1965 bus journey led by Charlie Perkins, to highlight racism against Indigenous Australians
 Reverse Freedom Rides, 1962 counter-action by segregationists, to the Freedom Rides in the southern United States

Music
 Freedom Ride (album), 2015 album by Troy Cassar-Daley
 The Freedom Rider, 1964 album by jazz drummer Art Blakey and his group the Jazz Messengers
 "Freedom Rider", 1970 song on the album John Barleycorn Must Die

Other uses
 Freedom Riders (film), 2010 American historical documentary film
 Freedom Rides Museum
 Freedom Riders National Monument

See also
 
 
 Equality Ride, periodic LGBT rights bus tour by Soulforce
 Freedom Ride 1992, an action by third-wave feminists in the U.S.
 Freedom Writers (disambiguation)